Sélincourt or Selincourt may refer to:

Agnes de Selincourt (1872–1917), Christian missionary in India
Aubrey de Sélincourt (1894–1962), English writer, classical scholar and translator
Basil de Sélincourt (1877–1966), British essayist and journalist
Ernest de Sélincourt (1870–1943), British literary scholar and critic
Hugh de Sélincourt (1878–1951), English author and journalist

fr:Sélincourt